The Silahdar Agha was a palace office of the Ottoman Empire, denoting the principal page of the Ottoman Sultan. As such its holders were persons of great influence, and provided many senior officials and even Grand Viziers.

The title derives from the Persian silahdar, meaning "arms-bearer", a title originally adopted by the Great Seljuks to denote one of the Sultan's principal aides, who bore his weapon and was responsible for the army's arsenal. The Ottomans inherited this title and elevated it further: by the time of Mehmed II the Silahdar Agha was the second-in-command of the Sultan's Privy Chamber (Hass Oda) underneath the hass oda bashi. The Privy Chamber in turn was the senior of the four chambers making up the palace's Inner Service (Enderûn) under the Kapi Agha.

The Silahdar Agha's duties in the palace involved handling all communications to and from the Sultan, as well as assisting him in all public ceremonies or travels, where the Agha accompanied the sovereign carrying his sword. The Silahdar Agha was also in charge of a special bodyguard regiment, the silahdar bölüğü or sarı bayrak bölüğü ("Yellow Banner Division") after its distinctive flag. The unit grew from 2,000 silahdars under Mehmed II to 2,780 in 1568, 2,930 in 1588, 5,000 in 1597, 6,244 in 1660, 7,683 in 1699, 10,821 in 1713, reaching 12,000 under Mahmud II.

Due to their proximity to the Sultan, the holders of the post were highly influential, and many occupants moved on to senior positions in the Ottoman government, including the supreme post of Grand Vizier. Under the capable Çorlulu Ali Pasha, who held the post in the reign of Mustafa II, it rose to such importance under that it assumed the last remaining powers of the once powerful Kapi Agha. The last holder of the office was Giritli Ali Pasha, who died in 1831. Sultan Mahmud II thereupon abolished the post, merging it with the steward of the treasury (khazine kethüdası).

References

Sources
 
 
 

Military of the Ottoman Empire
Ottoman court
Ottoman titles
Royal guards
Persian words and phrases